Protem is an unincorporated community in southeastern Taney County, Missouri, United States. It is located on Route 125, and is approximately two miles north of the Missouri-Arkansas state line. Protem is part of the Branson, Missouri Micropolitan Statistical Area.

A post office called Protem has been in operation since 1875.  The name comes from pro tem (Latin for "temporary"), because first settlers could not settle on a name and a temporary one (which became permanent) was needed.

References

Unincorporated communities in Taney County, Missouri
Branson, Missouri micropolitan area
Unincorporated communities in Missouri